Albert Sarkisyan (born 15 May 1975) is a Armenian football coach and a former midfielder. He is the head coach of the Under-16 team of Strogino Moscow. Albert was a member of the Armenia national team, participated in 33 international matches and scored 3 goals since his debut in away 1998 FIFA World Cup qualification match against Ukraine, on 5 May 1997.

National team statistics

International goals

Achievements
2009 Kazakhstan Cup

External links

1975 births
Living people
Sportspeople from Nalchik
Armenian footballers
Armenia international footballers
Armenian expatriate footballers
Russian people of Armenian descent
FC Lokomotiv Moscow players
FC Torpedo Moscow players
FC Arsenal Kyiv players
FC Spartak Vladikavkaz players
FC Akhmat Grozny players
Expatriate footballers in Russia
Expatriate footballers in Ukraine
Armenian expatriate sportspeople in Ukraine
Expatriate footballers in Kazakhstan
Ukrainian Premier League players
Russian Premier League players
PFC Spartak Nalchik players
FC Amkar Perm players
Armenian expatriate sportspeople in Kazakhstan
Association football midfielders
FC MVD Rossii Moscow players
Armenian football managers